Attorney General Davie may refer to:

Alexander Edmund Batson Davie (1847–1889), Attorney General of British Columbia
Theodore Davie (1852–1898), Attorney General of British Columbia

See also
Thomas Davy (politician) (1890–1933), Attorney-General of Western Australia
Attorney General Davies (disambiguation)